Kostal Lake is a lake located in Wells Gray Provincial Park, east-central British Columbia, Canada. It is located west of Murtle Lake and east of Clearwater Lake.

Naming
Kostal Lake was named by Angus Horne in 1936 for Frank Kostal, one of the many trappers and prospectors who visited this remote region during the first quarter of the 20th century. Kostal had a cabin by the lake which he used when collecting animals from his trapline on Kilpill Mountain.

Access
Visits to Kostal Lake are rare due to difficult access. A trail from Clearwater Lake Campground was built in 1971 and originally extended  to McDougall Lake and the west arm of Murtle Lake. The section beyond Kostal Lake has been impassable since the mid-1980s. The rest of the trail was permanently closed by B.C. Parks in 2013 and only the first  from the campground as far as the Dragon's Tongue lava flow can still be used. A rigorous access route is still possible by canoe up File Creek, then a cross-country hike over the lava flow.

Float planes and helicopters are not allowed to land at Kostal Lake. Landings are permitted at McDougall Lake, 6 km northeast. A permit from B.C. Parks is required.

Geology
Kostal Volcano rises  from the lake's northeast shore.

References

Lakes of British Columbia
Wells Gray-Clearwater
Kamloops Division Yale Land District